Haplochromis elegans is a species of cichlid endemic to Uganda where it occurs in Lake George, Lake Edward and the Kazinga Channel. This species can reach a length of  SL.

References 

 Scientific Results of the Cambridge Expedition to the East African Lakes, 1930‐1.–11. The Cichlid Fishes. E Trewavas, Zoological Journal of the Linnean Society, 1933
 DR. KARL JORDAN'S EXPEDITION TO SOUTH-WEST AFRICA AND ANGOLA: THE FRESH-WATER FISHES. E TREWAVAS, Ann. Mus. Congo Beige, 1933

elegans
Freshwater fish of Africa
Fish described in 1933
Taxonomy articles created by Polbot